Following the September 11 attacks in New York City, many people were unable to leave Lower Manhattan due to the closure of bridges and tunnels and mass transportation. Within minutes of the first plane hitting the first tower, multiple fireboats from the New York City Fire Department rushed to the scene. The United States Coast Guard coordinated a large convoy of merchant ships, tugboats, and ferries to evacuate the stranded and injured victims.

More than 150 different vessels and 600 sailors helped evacuate victims and delivered supplies in the days following the attacks. According to the Commandant of the Coast Guard James Loy, the mass evacuation of more than 500,000 civilians following the attacks "moved more people from the island than the 1940 evacuation of Allied troops from France."

Background 

Following the second plane crash into South Tower, the Port Authority of New York and New Jersey closed all of the bridges and tunnels under their jurisdiction. The MTA Bridges and Tunnels also closed their crossings into Manhattan for at least a day after the attacks. As a result, many people were either stranded in Lower Manhattan or tried to evacuate via East Rivers crossings, like the Brooklyn Bridge.

The United States Coast Guard New York Sector closed the New York Harbor to all ship movements. After the collapse of the South Tower, many evacuees began to arrive at the Lower Hudson River piers to try and evacuate.

Response

Coast Guard and government response 
The United States Coast Guard Vessel Traffic Service and the Harbor Unit of the New York Police Department put out an emergency radio calls to all nearby vessels to help evacuate from Battery Park. In addition to vessel coordination, the Coast Guard assisted at the Fresh Kills Landfill and Lower Manhattan with human remain and property recovery operations.

After the attacks on the World Trade Center towers on September 11, 2001, the Coast Guard tug , homeported in Bayonne, New Jersey, was the first on scene in New York harbor and acted as On-Scene Commander. Adak arrived on scene an hour later and took over On-Scene Commander responsibilities. For hours Adak coordinated the evacuation of civilians, transport of firefighters and rescue personnel, and the establishment of security zones to protect other high valued assets from further attack. For her part in the response to the attacks of September 11, Adak received the Secretary of Transportation Outstanding Unit Award.

Multiple fireboats of the New York City Fire Department, including Fire Fighter and the retired (since 1995) John J. Harvey, were among the first boats on the scene and provided firefighting activities from the water, pumping harbour water at high pressure to the hoses of land-based firefighters when other water was in low supply or simply unavailable due to breaks in the waterlines caused by the destruction of the towers.

Civilian response 
Multiple ferry lines, including the Staten Island Ferry and SeaStreak, helped in the evacuation. A variety of vessels including tugboats and merchant ships in the New York metropolitan area responded to the emergency calls for evacuations.

Aftermath 
Multiple news outlets praised the maritime coordination and evacuation. Norman Mineta, the Secretary of Transportation in a hearing in front of the National Commission on Terrorist Attacks Upon the United States said the response was the "largest maritime evacuation conducted in the history of the United States".

In 2011, a documentary called Boatlift: An Untold Tale of 9/11 Resilience was released detailing the stories of boat crews responding to the evacuations. It was narrated by Tom Hanks.

As part of the 20th anniversary commemoration, the New York Council Navy League of the United States honored the maritime operators for their heroism in "the Great Boatlift of 9/11".

References

Aftermath of the September 11 attacks
Hudson River
Water transportation in New York City
Maritime history of New York (state)